Andries Thomas "Andre" Markgraaff (born 23 December 1956) is a retired South African rugby union lock. He matriculated at Diamantveld High School and was a controversial national coach, who resigned after he was taped using the racial K-word.

Playing career
Markgraaff was selected for the South African team in 1986 against the Cavaliers but as an unused substitute. Markgraaff also represented Western Transvaal, Western Province, Griqualand West and the then South West Africa in 20 games. He captained the South African Barbarians on a tour to Europe and the Junior Springboks.

Coaching
In 1988, he became coach of Griqualand West. He became president of Griquas in 1991.

In 1996, Markgraaff was appointed as the Springbok rugby coach.
In 1997 Markgraaff was forced to quit after his controversial racial statements, when he referred to a black senior rugby administrator Mluleki George as a "kaffir". In his apology, Markgraaff said
"I'm not making any excuses. I was very emotional at the time. I apologise to the black people of this country and to the whites for causing them embarrassment."

During his short reign the Springboks won eight and lost five tests.

He also coached the Cats in Super Rugby and was a founder of the PUK Rugby Institute.

Markgraaff made a comeback in rugby administration and was the Deputy President of SARFU and the convener of SARFU's technical committee.

See also
 Invictus (film)

References

1956 births
Living people
Leopards (rugby union) players
North-West University alumni
Politics and race
Rugby union and apartheid
Rugby union controversies
Rugby union players from Kimberley, Northern Cape
South Africa national rugby union team coaches
South African rugby union coaches